Inape reductana is a species of moth of the family Tortricidae and is endemic to Peru.

The ground colour of the forewings is pale yellow. The hindwings are white with some grey marbling.

References

Moths described in 2003
Endemic fauna of Peru
Moths of South America
reductana
Taxa named by Józef Razowski